Kiel University, officially the Christian-Albrecht University of Kiel, (abbreviated CAU, known informally as Christiana Albertina) is a university in the city of Kiel, Germany. It was founded in 1665 as the Academia Holsatorum Chiloniensis by Christian Albert, Duke of Holstein-Gottorp and has approximately 27,000 students today. Kiel University is the largest, oldest, and most prestigious in the state of Schleswig-Holstein. Until 1864/66 it was not only the northernmost university in Germany but at the same time the 2nd largest university of Denmark. Faculty, alumni, and researchers of the Kiel University have won 12 Nobel Prizes. Kiel University has been a member of the German Universities Excellence Initiative since 2006. The Cluster of Excellence The Future Ocean, which was established in cooperation with the GEOMAR Helmholtz Centre for Ocean Research Kiel in 2006, is internationally recognized. The second Cluster of Excellence "Inflammation at Interfaces" deals with chronic inflammatory diseases. The Kiel Institute for the World Economy is also affiliated with Kiel University. The university has a great reputation for its focus on public international law. The oldest public international law institution in Germany and Europe – the Walther Schuecking Institute for International Law – is based in Kiel.

History 

Kiel University was founded under the name Christiana Albertina on 5 October 1665 by Christian Albert, Duke of Holstein-Gottorp. The citizens of the city of Kiel were initially quite sceptical about the upcoming influx of students, thinking that these could be "quite a pest with their gluttony, heavy drinking and their questionable character" (German: mit Fressen, Sauffen und allerley leichtfertigem Wesen sehr ärgerlich seyn). But those in the city who envisioned economic advantages of a university in the city won, and Kiel thus became the northernmost university in the German Holy Roman Empire.

After 1773, when Kiel had come under Danish rule, the university began to thrive, and when Kiel became part of Prussia in the year 1867, the university grew rapidly in size. The university opened one of the first botanical gardens in Germany (now the Alter Botanischer Garten Kiel), and Martin Gropius designed many of the new buildings needed to teach the growing number of students.

The Christiana Albertina was one of the first German universities to obey the Gleichschaltung in 1933 and agreed to remove many professors and students from the school, for instance Ferdinand Tönnies or Felix Jacoby. During World War II, Kiel University suffered heavy damage, therefore it was later rebuilt at a different location with only a few of the older buildings housing the medical school.

In 2019, it was announced it has banned full-face coverings in classrooms, citing the need for open communication that includes facial expressions and gestures.

Faculties 

Faculty of Theology
Faculty of Law
Faculty of Business, Economics and Social Sciences
Faculty of Medicine
Faculty of Arts and Humanities
Faculty of Mathematics and Natural Sciences
Faculty of Agricultural Science and Nutrition
Faculty of Engineering

Notable people

Alumni 
See also :Category:University of Kiel alumni
 Franz Boas (1858–1942), anthropologist
 Alice Bota (born 1979), journalist
 Georg von Dadelsen (1918–2007), musicologist, Neue Bach-Ausgabe
 Gerhard Domagk, bacteriologist, Nobel laureate
 Andre Franke, geneticist 
 Johanna Hellman (1889–1982), surgeon 
 Mareile Höppner, television presenter  
 Prof. Dr. Doris König, current judge of the Federal Constitutional Court of Germany, Germany's highest court
 Wolfgang Kubicki, politician, vice chairman of the FDP in Germany, from 1992 to 1993 and since 1996 he is faction leader of the FDP in the Landtag, the parliament of Schleswig-Holstein, member of the Bundestag
Oswald Pohl (1892–1951), Nazi SS officer executed for war crimes
 Viktoria Schmidt-Linsenhoff (1944–2013), German art historian and professor
 Gerhard Stoltenberg, politician, former prime minister of Schleswig-Holstein, former finance minister of Germany
 Peer Steinbrück, politician, former prime minister of North Rhine Westphalia, former finance minister of Germany
 Erich Walter Sternberg, composer
 Dr. Sibylle Kessal-Wulf, current judge of the Federal Constitutional Court of Germany, Germany's highest court
 Dr. Surya Hermawan, lecturer at Petra Christian University, Indonesia

Academics

Nobel Prize Winners 

There are several Nobel Prize Winners affiliated with Kiel University, including:
 1902 Theodor Mommsen (Literature)
 1905 Philipp Lenard (Physics)
 1907 Eduard Buchner (Chemistry)
 1918 Max Planck (Physics)
 1922 Otto Meyerhof (Medicine)
 1939 Gerhard Domagk (Medicine)
 1950 Kurt Alder and Otto Diels (Chemistry).

Points of interest 
 Botanischer Garten der Christian-Albrechts-Universität zu Kiel, the university's botanical garden

Gallery

Holstein Study Award 
CAU's most renowned award is the Holstein Study Award (Holsteiner Studienpreis), which is awarded to the university's top three students each year since 2001. The award's criteria include extraordinary academic achievements, a broad intellectual horizon and political or social involvement. It is endowed with a prize money of €500 for the 2nd and 3rd prize and €1000 for the 1st prize. The Holstein Study Award is funded by the association 'Iuventus Academiae Holsatorum'. The award's expert jury includes professors of various faculties and the prizes are awarded by the university's president or vice-president in a formal ceremony in the top floor of the skyscraper on campus.

See also 
 List of early modern universities in Europe
 Lists of universities and colleges

References

External links 

  
 Kiel University International Affairs
 Students' Association at Kiel University 

 
Universities and colleges in Schleswig-Holstein
University
Educational institutions established in the 1660s
1665 establishments in the Holy Roman Empire